Downhill from Everywhere is the fifteenth studio album by American singer-songwriter Jackson Browne. It was released by Inside Recordings on July 23, 2021, and is Browne's first album of new material in seven years. It was nominated for a 2022 Grammy Award in the Best Americana Album category.

Track listing
All songs are written by Jackson Browne, with co-writers listed below.

Production 
 Jackson Browne – producer
 Kevin Smith – recording, mixing
 "A Human Touch" recorded and mixed by Ryan Freeland
 "Minutes to Downtown" recorded by Nate Kunkel
 "Downhill from Everywhere", "A Little Soon to Say" and "My Cleveland Heart" recorded by Paul Dieter
 Mastered by Gavin Lurssen and Rueben Cohen at Lurssen Mastering, Burbank, California
 Vinyl mastered by Jeff Powell at Take Out Vinyl, Memphis, Tennessee
 Recorded at Groove Masters, Santa Monica, California

Charts

References

2021 albums
Jackson Browne albums
albums recorded at Groove Masters Studios